District 3 of the Oregon State Senate comprises southern Jackson County. It is currently represented by Democrat Jeff Golden of Ashland.

Election results
District boundaries have changed over time, therefore, senators before 2013 may not represent the same constituency as today. From 1993 until 2003, the district covered parts of Washington and northern Multnomah counties, and from 2003 until 2013 it covered a slightly different area in southern Oregon.

References

03
Jackson County, Oregon